Hugo Demarco (13 July 1932—28 November 1995) was an Argentinian-born French painter associated with the kinetic (op art) and Nouvelle Tendance movements. Demarco's work is concerned largely with color and movement and he often used prisms to reflect light and create movement. His work created "very active structures, in spite of the simplicity of their patterns" by using form, color, texture, and rhythm, including color degradation and chromatic contrasts, to create movement.

Biography
Hugo Rodolfo Demarco was born in Buenos Aires, Argentina on 13 July 1932. He was of Italian descent and later spent time in Brescia, Italy.

After finishing his degree at Escuela Nacional de Bellas Artes in Buenos Aires in 1957, Demarco taught painting and design. Not long after, in 1959, he moved to Paris with Julio Le Parc and Horacio García Rossi, his former classmates, to join the French art scene. Demarco started creating kinetic artwork with other Latin American expat artists, including Argentinians Antonio Asis, Mariano Carrera, Carlos Agüero, and Armando Durante and Venezuelan Jesús Rafael Soto, in addition to Le Parc and García Rossi. He was among the early members of the Groupe de Recherche d'Art Visuel (GRAV), a group of visual artists including Le Parc, Soto, Sérgio de Camargo, and François Morellet, among others. He was also in Position, a group of Argentinian geometrical artists living and working in Paris, including Antonio Asis, Carlos Agüero, and Armando Durante, upon its creation in 1971. He also served as a trainer for the PUC rugby club.

Demarco's first solo painting and relief exhibition was at Galerie Denise René in 1961. In 1963, he and other Latin American artists received a grant from the French government to stay in Paris and continue creating art. Demarco was featured in two documentaries within the Nouvelle Tendance movement: Le mouvement (1966) and Lumière et mouvement (1967). In 1967, he held a one-man exhibition at both the Op Gallery Esslingen and at Denise René's Hans Nager Gallery in Krefeld, Germany.

In June 1968, Demarco, Le Parc, and Costa Rican artist Juan Luis Rodriguez Sibaja were on their way to a pro-union demonstration in Flins when Demarco and Le Parc were arrested by the French military police. At this time, France was in a state of discontent and student protests were worrying the government, who thought they may go as far as civil war. Demarco and Le Parc were deported and spent several months in exile, initially staying in Belgium but later traveling through Germany, Italy, and Spain. During their absence, a number of foreign artists threatened to leave the country. The expulsion, however, gave Demarco and Le Parc the attention they were looking for as artists and suddenly found themselves in demand. Within a few months, they were allowed to return to France on the grounds that they would not engage in political activism again.

Demarco and his wife Amalia had children. He died in the Aubervilliers area of Paris on 28 November 1995. The highest recorded price for one of Demarco's paintings was a 2008 Sotheby's New York auction that sold Relief à Deplacement Continuelle for $67,000 USD.

Galleries 
Among the many places in which his artwork has been displayed are:

References

1932 births
1995 deaths
People from Buenos Aires
Argentine painters
Argentine male painters
20th-century French painters
20th-century male artists
French male painters
Op art
Painters from Paris
Engravers from Paris